Geoffrey Rigathi Gachagua (born 28 February 1965) is a Kenyan politician who has served as the Deputy President of Kenya since 2022. He previously served as the Member of Parliament for Mathira Constituency between 2017 and 2022 as member of the Jubilee Party. In the 2022 election, William Ruto selected Gachagua as his running mate, and the two were elected with just over 50% of the vote.

He previously served in more junior roles in government, including Assistant Secretary in the Ministry of Home Affairs & National Heritage, Personal Assistant to the Head of the Public Service, Personal Assistant to Uhuru Kenyatta, who was then Minister for Local Government and as a District Officer.

Early life and education 
He was born in 1965 in Hiriga village of Nyeri County, being the eighth-born child of Nahashon Gachagua Reriani and Martha Kirigo. He is the younger brother to the late Nderitu Gachagua, the first governor of Nyeri County. His parents were Mau Mau freedom fighters in Mount Kenya Forest, where Nahashon was building and servicing guns for the freedom fighters.

He enrolled at Kabiruini Primary School from 1971 to 1977 before proceeding to Kianyaga High School for his O-levels and A-levels. In 1985, he joined the University of Nairobi, where he graduated with a Bachelor of Arts Degree in Political Science and Literature in 1988.

At the University of Nairobi, Gachagua was the Nyeri District University Students Association (NDUSA) leader as well as the chairman of the Association of Literature Students.

Career 
After graduating, Gachagua was employed for a short time at the Kenya's Ministry of Home Affairs & National Heritage before he joined the Administration Police Institute in 1990. After graduating from the Administration Police Institute, Gachagua was posted at the Office of President Daniel arap Moi as a District Officer Cadet between 1991 and 1992.

Gachagua then went on to serve as a District Officer in Kakamega, Ng'arua and Laikipia districts. Between 1999 and 2000, he joined Kenya School of Government where he graduated with an Advanced Diploma in Public Administration. Between 2001 and 2006, Gachagua worked as the Personal Assistant to Uhuru Kenyatta.

Between 2007 and 2017, Gachagua remained behind the scenes running his businesses.

Political career

Member of Parliament 
Gachagua was elected as a member of parliament for Mathira constituency in the 2017 election.

Rigathi Gachagua is known for his outspoken, aggressive and sometimes abrasive style of politics. His time as a legislator was characterized by championing issues that centered primarily on the needs of Mount Kenya residents; often he addressed issues by publicly putting the authority figures mandated to solve them to task. William Ruto would later cite this as one of the reasons Gachagua was chosen as his running mate saying, “Gachagua is a very passionate leader, a people's person. He speaks about ordinary people...”

In 2017, Gachagua took on Keriako Tobiko as the Cabinet Secretary for Environment and Forestry. The Cabinet Secretary had  raised the alarm regarding overexploitation of upstream water resources in the Mt. Kenya Region and directed the Kenya Forest Service to destroy illegal intakes. Gachagua claimed that many of the intakes destroyed were legal and that this had occasioned a water crisis for thousands of people. He said, “I am calling for his [Tobiko's] sacking on the basis of incompetence; he is not able to appraise the situation. He did not do due diligence on the legality of the intakes and he failed in analysis of the humanitarian crisis arising from the situation.” 

The Minister of Water and Sanitation, Simon Chelugui, was drawn into the fray, meeting with Gachagua and other Mt Kenya legislators over the matter. He promised to have all intakes with necessary documentation restored.

Legislation 
In 2019, Gachagua sponsored an amendment bill to the Public Procurement and Asset Disposal Act, 2015. He argued that Kenyan firms could not fairly compete and would be run out of the market by Chinese firms that were able to get loans at less than a sixth the interest rates. He was also critical of the alleged market advantages the Chinese received when carrying out government business, he said "What is annoying us is that once they get a contract the materials coming for the construction is procured from China, and they import it duty free." The amendment reserved government contracts under 1 billion shillings for local companies and proposed stiffer penalties for circumventing the local ownership requirements for larger contracts. The bill would eventually be turned down by the National Assembly's Finance and National Planning committee, citing limited local capacity to provide goods and services as the reason.

Deputy President 
On 15 May 2022, he was nominated as the running mate to the United Democratic Alliance presidential candidate Ruto under the Kenya Kwanza political coalition. Others who were eyeing the same position included Kirinyaga Governor Anne Waiguru, Kandara MP Alice Muthoni Wahome, Tharaka Nithi Senator Kithure A. Kindiki and National Assembly Speaker Justin Muturi.

Gachagua has a chequered past with pending court cases over alleged cases of misappropriation of government funds.

On 28 July 2022, a Kenyan court ordered Rigathi Gachagua to reimburse KSh. 202 million (US$1.7 million), finding that the money was derived from corruption.

In November 2022, Rigathi Gachagua faced corruption charges in a $60 million case. These charges were eventually dropped.

Personal life 
Rigathi is married to Dorcas Wanjiku Rigathi, a retired banker who is now a pastor in Mathira.

They met at a joint university event that was graced by President Moi at the University of Nairobi in 1985. They got married in 1989 and have two sons, Kevin and Keith.

References

External links
 Gachagua's political crusade against liquor trade, Africa Intelligence, February 17, 2023 (requires free registration)

|-

|-

|-

1965 births
Living people
Vice-presidents of Kenya
Jubilee Party politicians
21st-century Kenyan politicians
People from Nyeri County
University of Nairobi alumni
Kenyan businesspeople